The U.S. state of Oklahoma first required its residents to register their motor vehicles and display license plates in 1915. As of 2023, plates are issued by Service Oklahoma. Only rear plates have been required since 1944.

Prior to July 1, 2019, plates belonged to the car, not the owner. As a result of lost turnpike toll revenue and law enforcement having trouble tracking vehicle owners, the law was changed, meaning plates now belong to vehicle owners and can be transferred from a previous vehicle to a new vehicle.

Passenger baseplates

1915 to 1978
The 1955 (dated 1956) issue was the first Oklahoma license plate that complied with these standards.

1979 to present

County coding
The order of the numeric county codes used from 1952–61 was based on the populations of each county according to the 1950 United States Census, and the order of the codes used in 1962 was based on the populations of each county according to the 1960 Census., in 2009 county codes were reintroduced on month stickers.

Non-passenger plates

Optional plates

References

External links
Oklahoma license plates, 1969–present

Oklahoma
Oklahoma transportation-related lists
Transportation in Oklahoma